Tia Ray (simplified Chinese: 袁娅维; traditional Chinese: 袁婭維; pinyin: Yuán Yàwéi; born 12 December) is a Chinese singer-songwriter from Hunan, China. She rose to fame in 2012 as a contestant on the televised singing competition The Voice of China, where she finished as one of the final contenders. She has since released four commercially successful albums, all of which she co-wrote and co-produced.

Prior to breaking into the mainstream, Ray has spent close to a decade performing in smaller venues, music festivals and collaborating with musicians in Beijing, where she pursued her studies of performing arts. In 2010, she formed her jazz band The Knutz with Chinese and African American musicians, with whom she wrote, recorded and performed mainly R&B and neo soul music.

Ray had her international breakthrough in 2018 with the hit “Be Apart”, which generated 1.8 billion streams and was the seventh bestselling single in the world that year. She has since collaborated with various artists from the United States, including Kehlani, Jason Derulo, Gallant and Far East Movement, blending Chinese elements with traditionally Western music styles. Domestically, she has worked with singer-rapper Jackson Wang from the K-pop group GOT7 and Masiwei from Chengdu rap group Higher Brothers.

Ray's popularity in Taiwan and Chinese-speaking communities has grown over the years. In 2021, she released her fourth studio album “ONCE UPON A MOON” and received the “Most Popular Female Singer of the Year” award from state-broadcaster China Central Television (CCTV).

Life and career 
Ray was born and raised in the town of Huai Hua, in the southwest province of Hunan. Ray's interest in music began at a young age, after being introduced by her friend to American singer Mariah Carey. In Grade 7, she won her first award in singing at a school competition. A few years later, she left her hometown for Beijing in pursuit of performing arts studies.

2000 - 2010: Career Beginnings 
Inspired by neo soul artists like India Arie, Stevie Wonder, Eryka Badu and Jill Scott, Ray formed her first band Soulside with fellow young musicians in Beijing. Soulside focused on R&B and soul music, which were niche genres in the local live music scene, occupied largely by old-school rock and jazz musicians. The band gained a following through live-house and festival performances.

In 2010, Ray started her second band The Knutz. They continued to play at emerging venues and record original music.

2012 - 2014: The Voice of China; release of debut album T.I.A. 
Ray's mainstream breakthrough came in 2012, when she joined the televised singing competition The Voice of China. Her blues-infused rendition of the Chinese folk classic "The Curvy Moon" (弯弯的月亮) received critical acclaim from the judges. She signed with Gold Typhoon Group, one of China's largest independent music companies before being acquired by Warner Music Group in 2014, and released her debut album T.I.A., writing or co-writing all songs, including the hits "Lost In Traveling" and "Love Can Fly".

2017 - 2018: Breakthrough hit; TIARA 
In 2017, Ray recorded "Be Apart" for the soundtrack of the movie The Ex-File: The Return of the Exes, which became her biggest hit and the seventh highest-selling song on IFPI's Global Singles chart. The following year, she released her sophomore album TIARA and kicked off her first solo concert tour. She collaborated with R&B singer Kehlani on "Just My Luck”, Jackson Wang on "Lucky Rain" and Will Pan on his single “Moonlight”.

2019: International collaborations; 1212 
In 2019, Ray released an EP titled 1212, written, produced and recorded mainly in Los Angeles, where she worked with local musicians including The Rascals, frequent collaborator of Ariana Grande, Kehlani and Babyface, whom she met in one of the studio sessions.

During her stay in the city, she also collaborated with hip-hop group Far East Movement on "Paint the Clouds", Gallant on "Trust Myself," and Jason Derulo on "Champion", the theme song of the 2019 FIBA Basketball World Cup.

2020 - Present: Beijing Winter Olympics theme song; release of ONCE UPON A MOON 
In 2020, Ray released “Starfall” featuring electronic group HOYO-MiX, the theme song of Chinese video game Honkai Impact 3rd.

She recorded the original version of the Beijing Winter Olympics theme song "Together for a Shared Future" with Hong Kong singer William Chan, which developed into a final version featuring over 200 artists.

In 2021, she released her fourth studio album ONCE UPON A MOON, spanning the singles "I'M NOT GOOD", "EMO WHISKEY" and "LITTLE TOO MUCH". She also recorded an hour-long performance of new and old tracks, released together with the album.

Musical style 
Ray's music is heavily influenced by urban and African American genres like R&B, Soul and Jazz. She believes in the ability of music to transcend race. Critics and peers, including singer Hua Chenyu have described her as an "innovator" injecting new elements into the Chinese music industry.

Discography

Studio albums 
 T.I.A. (2014)
 TIARA (2018)
 1212 (2019)
 ONCE UPON A MOON (2021)
 TRIP (2022)

Lead Singles 
 "You Know I Love You" (2004)
 "Because of Love" (2004)
 "Stage Sisters" (2008)
 "Love Passes Love" (2008)
 "Tacit Understanding of Love" (2008)
 "Sweet Things" (2009)
 "Blossom" (2015)
 "Uncle Long Legs" (2016)
 "Love Herby" (2016)
 "Be Apart" (2018)
 "Starfall" (2020)
 "I'M NOT GOOD (2021)
 “TIVA000” (2021)

Collaborations 
 "Just My Luck" (featuring Kehlani) (2018)
 "Lucky Rain" (featuring Jackson Wang) (2018)
 "Moonlight" (Will Pan featuring Tia Ray) (2018)
 "Paint the Clouds" (Far East Movement featuring Tia Ray) (2019)
 "Trust Myself" (featuring Gallant) (2019)
 "Complicated" (featuring Victor Ma) (2019)
 "Champion" (Jason Derulo featuring Tia Ray) (2019)
 "Be The Legend" (featuring Rtruenahmean) (2020)
 "Together for a Shared Future" (with William Chan) (2021)
 "DANCE TO THE MOONLIGHT" (featuring Nigel Tay) (2021)
 "Slow Ride" (with Matt Lv) (2022)
 "Like Me" (Masiwei featuring Tia Ray) (2022)
 "It Isn't Me" (with 22Bullets and Kshmr) (2022)

Achievements

I Am a Singer performances

Singer 2017 
Ray first appeared in the I Am a Singer series as one of eight "Initial singers" for the season. After Ray narrowly avoid elimination for the first two shows (on the first week however, she was declared safe due to a contestant's withdrawal from the competition), she was eliminated on the third week. Ray later advanced to the semi-finals after reinstating her in the Breakout rounds, and finished in seventh place.

Singer 2018 
Ray was invited as one of the four guest singers from the 2017 season during the season's biennial concert along with a guest Victor Ma. That season was currently the latest season to feature a concert airing after the finals held a week prior. The 2018 season also featured runner-up Hua Chenyu, who would also later compete along with Ray and two other singers two years later, and Hua gone on to win the season.

Singer 2019 
Ray was again invited as a guest singer on the seventh season to accompany with Liu Huan (the eventual winner for that season) once more during the semi-finals.

Singer 2020 
Ray later returned for her second season in 2020, entitled Year of the Hits, as one of the four returning singers from seasons four to six (including Lala Hsu, Jam Hsiao and season's winner Hua Chenyu). Ray was again eliminated after week eight (and unlike previous seasons, Ray was not entitled to Returning Performances the following week due to safety concerns regarding the coronavirus outbreak at the time), but she was reinstated upon her success in the Breakouts and went on to clinch as the season's runner-up, making her the best-performing previously eliminated singer in the series.

References

1984 births
Living people
Mandopop singer-songwriters
21st-century Chinese women singers